Moro Province was a province of the Philippines consisting of the regions of Zamboanga, Lanao, Cotabato, Davao, and Jolo. It was later split into provinces and regions organized under the Department of Mindanao and Sulu, along with the former provinces of Agusan, and current province of Bukidnon.

Government

The province was governed under a civil government that has an executive, judicial and legislative branch and is divided into military districts.

The governor served also as the commander of the Army Department of Mindanao-Jolo. Most of the district governors and their deputies were members of the U.S. military. In 1913, the military governor was replaced by a civil governor.

The Moro Council served as the legislative body of the province. The governor and its members were appointed by and with the consent of the Philippine Commission.

Justice was administered for the province by two (2) Courts of First Instance, Justice of the Peace Courts and by the Municipal Courts.

The province had its own Department of Public Instruction, separate from the education system that covered the rest of the Philippine Islands.

Districts

The province was divided into five districts, with U.S. officers serving as district governors and deputy governors. These districts included: Cotabato, Davao, Lanao, Jolo, and Zamboanga. The district government is composed of the governor, the secretary, and the treasurer who were all appointed by the provincial governor.

The district officials also form as the District Board which had the power to enact ordinances although subject to the approval of the Legislative Council.

Tribal Wards
The districts were sub-divided into tribal wards, with major datus serving as ward chiefs and minor datus serving as deputies, judges, and sheriffs.

The head of the tribe has the power to sub-divide his wards and appoint deputies into these sub-wards with the approval of the district governor.

Christian communities
The tribal wards were applied only to Muslim communities. Meanwhile, the minority Christian communities were merged into regular municipalities.

The government of each municipality was composed of a president, vice-president and a municipal council. The President and half of the councilors were elected by qualified voters and the other half is appointed by the district governor.

History
After the dissolution of the Republic of Zamboanga and others part of Mindanao are under U.S. rule, the U.S. civil government led by Governor William Howard Taft authorized the creation of the Moro Province that includes "all of the territory of the Philippines lying south of the eight parallel of latitude, excepting the island of Palawan and the eastern portion of the northwest peninsula of Mindanao." The Province was created by the virtue of Act No. 787 on June 1, 1903. Major General Leonard Wood, with the capacity of commander of the Army Department of Mindanao-Sulu was appointed governor of the province on August 6, 1903.

Governors

Military to Civilian Government
By 1913, Governor Pershing agreed that the Moro Province needed to transition to civil government. This was prompted by the Moro's personalistic approach to government, which was based on personal ties rather than a respect for an abstract office. To the Moros, a change of administration meant not just a change in leadership but a change in regime, and was a traumatic experience. Rotation within the military meant that each military governor could serve only for a limited time. Until 1911, every district governor and secretary had been a military officer. By November 1913, only one officer still held a civil office – Pershing himself. In December 1913, Pershing was replaced as governor of Moro Province by a civilian, Frank Carpenter.

Dissolution
On July 23, 1914, the Moro Province was officially replaced by an agency named the Department of Mindanao and Sulu including the whole island of Mindanao except Lanao. The agency was tasked to administer  all Muslim-dominated areas in the territory. Frank Carpenter remained as governor of the agency.

See also
Moro Rebellion
Zamboanga City
Cotabato City
Davao
Department of Mindanao and Sulu
General Leonard Wood

References 

Former provinces of the Philippines
1903 establishments in the Philippines
1914 disestablishments in the Philippines